"I Call It Love" is a song by American singer Lionel Richie. It was written by Mikkel S. Eriksen, Tor Erik Hermansen, and Phillip "Taj" Jackson for Richie's eighth studio album Coming Home (2006), while production was helmed by Eriksen and Hermansen under their production moniker Stargate. The song was released as the album's lead single and reached number-one on Billboards urban adult contemporary chart. Nicole Richie starred in the accompanying music video.

Track listing

Notes
 signifies an additional producer

Charts

Weekly charts

Year-end charts

References

2006 singles
Lionel Richie songs
Song recordings produced by Stargate (record producers)
Songs written by Tor Erik Hermansen
Songs written by Mikkel Storleer Eriksen
2006 songs